Eugene Licorish (born 28 November 1964) is a retired Grenadian long jumper.

He competed at the 1992 Olympic Games and the 1993 World Championships, but without reaching the final round.

His personal best jump is 8.09 metres, achieved in May 1989 in Port of Spain, which is the Grenadian record.

References

Links

Profile, sports-reference.com; accessed 27 November 2014.

1964 births
Living people
Grenadian long jumpers
Athletes (track and field) at the 1991 Pan American Games
Athletes (track and field) at the 1992 Summer Olympics
Olympic athletes of Grenada
Grenadian male athletes
Pan American Games competitors for Grenada